Chacon Creek, is a stream tributary to the Nueces River via Picosa Creek, Turkey Creek, Espantosa Slough and into the Nueces through Line Oak or Soldier Sloughs.  Its source is at the conjunction of Elm Creek with Salado Creek, in Maverick County. Its mouth is at is conjunction with Picosa Creek in Zavala County, Texas.

See also
List of rivers of Texas

References

Tributaries of the Nueces River
Bodies of water of Maverick County, Texas
Rivers of Zavala County, Texas
Rivers of Texas